Peci or PECI may refer to:
 Peci, a type of cap
 PECI (gene)
 Peći (Bosansko Grahovo), a village in Bosnia and Herzegovina
 Peći (Ključ), a village in Bosnia and Herzegovina
 Peći (Srebrenica), a village in Bosnia and Herzegovina
 Platform Environment Control Interface
 Portland Energy Conservation

People 
 Aleksandër Peçi (born 1951), Albanian composer
 Sotir Peçi (1873–1932), Albanian politician
 Faton Peci
 József Pecsovszky (1921–1968), Romanian footballer